Pseudoliparis swirei, the Mariana snailfish or Mariana hadal snailfish, is a species of snailfish found at hadal depths in the Mariana Trench in the western Pacific Ocean. Various anatomical, physiological, molecular and genetic adaptions help this species survive in such depths.

It is apparently the top predator along certain stretches of the Mariana Trench, feeding on tiny crustaceans in a deep-water habitat with few larger predators. Pseudoliparis swirei are abundant in their deep-sea habitat and lay relatively large eggs that are almost  in diameter.

Discovery
The first specimens of this species were caught during the expedition of the research vessel Falkor. To catch the fish, deep-water traps designed to minimize the damage to the caught fish during the ascent were used. Mackerel was used as bait. Findings of hadal fish are limited, as the trawl catch method used for catching causes them to end up in very low quantities and poor condition. The first representative of this species was caught on November 15, 2014. In the next 10 days another 35 were caught. Another representative of this species was caught on January 29, 2017, during the expedition of the research ship Shinyo-maru.

Depth record and adaptations
This is possibly the depth record for a fish caught on the seafloor.

Due to the extreme pressure,  appears to be around the theoretical maximum depth possible for fish.

Compared to shallow-water snailfish, Pseudoliparis swirei has several unusual adaptions for its dark and high pressure habitat, including transparent skin that lacks pigment, certain organs and eggs that are enlarged, the muscles are thinner, the ossification of its bones (notably the skull) is incomplete, it appears to have little or no ability to see, there are mechanisms that allow proteins in its body to still function, and differences in the cell membranes for maintaining their flexibility.

Etymology
In 1876 the expedition found the Challenger Deep, habitat of the Mariana snailfish.

Reproduction
Eggs of intermediate size were rarely seen. Even in the largest eggs, no structures were found that indicate the development of the embryo within the eggs.

References

Liparidae
Fish described in 2017